The Capture of Béjaïa or Capture of Bougie occurred in 1555 when Salah Rais, the Ottoman ruler of Algiers,  took the city of  Béjaïa  from the Spaniards. The main fortification in Béjaïa was the Spanish presidio, occupied by about 100 men under first under Luis Peralta, and then his son Alonso Peralta.

The city was captured by Salah Rais from his base of Algiers, at the head of several thousand men and a small fleet consisting in 2 galleys, a barque, and a French saëte ("flèche" or "arrow") requisitioned in Algiers. Peralta had sent messages to Spain for help, and Andrea Doria prepared to leave with a fleet from Naples, but it was too late.

The Spanish force was defeated, but Salah Rais promised that Alonso Peralta was allowed to leave unharmed with 40 men of his choice. The promise was violated by the Turks and Kabyles who captured the soldiers with the exception of don Alonso and Luis. On the 28th of September the Algerians indefinitely occupied the city, took a rich booty and divided amongst themselves 600 slaves. Don Alonso was severely criticized upon his return to Spain, and was beheaded in Valladolid on 4 May 1556.

The capture of Béjaïa permitted the Ottomans to encircle the Spanish position at Goletta and that of their ally Ahmad Sultan in Tunis, as they now had strong bases in Béjaïa and Tripoli.

Notes

Béjaïa
Béjaïa
Béjaïa
16th century in Algeria
1555 in the Ottoman Empire
1555 in Africa
Béjaïa